Welcome to the Traphouse is a mixtape by rapper Young Buck, hosted by DJ Drama. The mixtape features exclusive tracks and freestyles from Young Buck with appearances by Pimp C, All Star Cashville Prince, Yo Gotti, B.G. and more. It was released for digital download on August 21, 2006. This is the second of three mixtapes released by Buck to promote his upcoming album Buck the World.

Track list

References

2006 mixtape albums
Young Buck albums
DJ Drama albums